Julio Florencio Cortázar (26 August 1914 – 12 February 1984) was an Argentine, nationalized French novelist, short story writer, essayist, and translator. Known as one of the founders of the Latin American Boom, Cortázar influenced an entire generation of Spanish-speaking readers and writers in America and Europe.

He is considered one of the most innovative and original authors of his time, a master of history, poetic prose and short story in general and a creator of important novels that inaugurated a new way of making literature in the Hispanic world by breaking the classical molds through narratives that escaped temporal linearity.

He lived his childhood and adolescence and incipient maturity in Argentina and, after the 1950s, in Europe. He lived in Italy, Spain, and in Switzerland. In 1951, he settled in France for more than three decades and composed some of his works there.

Early life
Julio Cortázar was born on 26 August 1914, in Ixelles, a municipality of Brussels, Belgium. According to biographer Miguel Herráez, his parents, Julio José Cortázar and María Herminia Descotte, were Argentine citizens, and his father was attached to the Argentine diplomatic service in Belgium.

At the time of Cortázar's birth, Belgium was occupied by the German troops of Kaiser Wilhelm II. After German troops arrived in Belgium, Cortázar and his family moved to Zürich where María Herminia's parents, Victoria Gabel and Louis Descotte (a French National), were waiting in neutral territory. The family group spent the next two years in Switzerland, first in Zürich, then Geneva, before moving for a short period to Barcelona. The Cortázars settled outside of Buenos Aires by the end of 1919.

Cortázar's father left when Julio was six, and the family had no further contact with him. Cortázar spent most of his childhood in Banfield, a suburb south of Buenos Aires, with his mother and younger sister. The home in Banfield, with its back yard, was a source of inspiration for some of his stories. Despite this, in a letter to Graciela M. de Solá on 4 December 1963, he described this period of his life as "full of servitude, excessive touchiness, terrible and frequent sadness." He was a sickly child and spent much of his childhood in bed reading. His mother, who spoke several languages and was a great reader herself, introduced her son to the works of Jules Verne, whom Cortázar admired for the rest of his life. In the magazine Plural (issue 44, Mexico City, May 1975) he wrote: "I spent my childhood in a haze full of goblins and elves, with a sense of space and time that was different from everybody else's".

Education and teaching career

Cortázar obtained a qualification as an elementary school teacher at the age of 18. He would later pursue higher education in philosophy and languages at the University of Buenos Aires Faculty of Philosophy and Letters, but left for financial reasons without receiving a degree. According to biographer Montes-Bradley, Cortázar taught in at least two high schools in Buenos Aires Province, one in the city of Chivilcoy, the other in Bolivar. In 1938, using the pseudonym of Julio Denis, he self-published a volume of sonnets, Presencia, which he later repudiated, saying in a 1977 interview for Spanish television that publishing it was his only transgression to the principle of not publishing any books until he was convinced that what was written in them was what he meant to say. In 1944, he became professor of French literature at the National University of Cuyo in Mendoza, but owing to political pressure from Peronists, he resigned the position in June 1946. He subsequently worked as a translator and as director of the Cámara Argentina del Libro, a trade organization. In 1949 he published a play, Los Reyes (The Kings), based on the myth of Theseus and the Minotaur. In 1980, Cortázar delivered eight lectures at the University of California, Berkeley.

Years in France
In 1951, Cortázar immigrated to France, where he lived and worked for the rest of his life, though he traveled widely. From 1952 onwards, he worked intermittently for UNESCO as a translator. He wrote most of his major works in Paris or in Saignon in the south of France, where he also maintained a home. In later years he became actively engaged in opposing abuses of human rights in Latin America, and was a supporter of the Sandinista revolution in Nicaragua as well as Fidel Castro's Cuban revolution and Salvador Allende's socialist government in Chile.

Cortázar had three long-term romantic relationships with women. The first was with Aurora Bernárdez, an Argentine translator, whom he married in 1953. They separated in 1968 when he became involved with the Lithuanian writer, editor, translator, and filmmaker Ugnė Karvelis, whom he never formally married, and who reportedly stimulated Cortázar's interest in politics, although his political sensibilities had already been awakened by a visit to Cuba in 1963, the first of multiple trips that he would make to that country throughout the remainder of his life. In 1981 he married Canadian writer Carol Dunlop. After Dunlop's death in 1982, Aurora Bernárdez accompanied Cortázar during his final illness and, in accordance with his longstanding wishes, inherited the rights to all his works.

Death
Cortázar died in Paris in 1984, and is interred in the cimetière du Montparnasse. The cause of his death was reported to be leukemia, though some sources state that he died from AIDS as a result of receiving a blood transfusion.

Works

Cortázar wrote numerous short stories, collected in such volumes as Bestiario (1951), Final del juego (1956), and Las armas secretas (1959). In 1967, English translations by Paul Blackburn of stories selected from these volumes were published by Pantheon Books as End of the Game and Other Stories; it was later re-titled Blow-up and Other Stories. Cortázar published four novels during his lifetime: Los premios (The Winners, 1960), Hopscotch (Rayuela, 1963), 62: A Model Kit (62 Modelo para Armar, 1968), and Libro de Manuel (A Manual for Manuel, 1973). Except for Los premios, which was translated by Elaine Kerrigan, these novels have been translated into English by Gregory Rabassa. Two other novels, El examen and Divertimento, though written before 1960, only appeared posthumously.

The open-ended structure of Hopscotch, which invites the reader to choose between a linear and a non-linear mode of reading, has been praised by other Latin American writers, including José Lezama Lima, Giannina Braschi, Carlos Fuentes, Gabriel García Márquez, and Mario Vargas Llosa. Cortázar's use of interior monologue and stream of consciousness owes much to James Joyce and other modernists, but his main influences were Surrealism, the French Nouveau roman and the improvisatory aesthetic of jazz. This last interest is reflected in the notable story "El perseguidor" ("The Pursuer"), which Cortázar based on the life of the bebop saxophonist Charlie Parker.

Cortázar also published poetry, drama, and various works of non-fiction. In the 1960s, working with the artist José Silva, he created two almanac-books or libros-almanaque, La vuelta al día en ochenta mundos and Último Round, which combined various texts written by Cortázar with photographs, engravings, and other illustrations, in the manner of the almanaques del mensajero that had been widely circulated in rural Argentina during his childhood. One of his last works was a collaboration with Carol Dunlop, The Autonauts of the Cosmoroute, which relates, partly in mock-heroic style, the couple's extended expedition along the autoroute from Paris to Marseille in a Volkswagen camper nicknamed Fafner. As a translator, he completed Spanish-language renderings of Robinson Crusoe, Marguerite Yourcenar's novel Mémoires d'Hadrien, and the complete prose works of Edgar Allan Poe.

Influence and legacy

Michelangelo Antonioni's film Blowup (1966) was inspired by Cortázar's story "Las babas del diablo", which in turn was based on a photograph taken by Chilean photographer Sergio Larraín during a shoot outside of Notre Dame Cathedral in Paris. Cortázar's story "La autopista del sur" ("The Southern Thruway") influenced another film of the 1960s, Jean-Luc Godard's Week End (1967). The filmmaker Manuel Antín has directed three films based on Cortázar stories, Cartas de mamá, Circe and Intimidad de los parques.

Chilean novelist Roberto Bolaño cited Cortázar as a key influence on his novel The Savage Detectives: "To say that I'm permanently indebted to the work of Borges and Cortázar is obvious."

Puerto Rican novelist Giannina Braschi used Cortázar's story "Las babas del diablo" as a springboard for the chapter called "Blow-up" in her bilingual novel Yo-Yo Boing! (1998), which features scenes with Cortázar's characters La Maga and Rocamadour. Cortázar is mentioned and spoken highly of in Rabih Alameddine's 1998 novel, Koolaids: The Art of War.

North American novelist Deena Metzger cites Cortázar as co-author of her novel Doors: A Fiction for Jazz Horn, written twenty years after his death.

In Buenos Aires, a school, a public library, and a square in the Palermo neighborhood carry Cortázar's name.

Bibliography

Novels
Divertimento (1949, first published in 1986)
El examen (Final Exam) (1950, first published in 1985)
Los premios (The Winners) (1960)
Rayuela (Hopscotch) (1963)
62/modelo para armar (62: A Model Kit) (1968)
Libro de Manuel (A Manual for Manuel) (1973)

Short story collections
Bestiario (1951)
Final del juego (End of the Game) (1956)
Las armas secretas (1959)
Historias de cronopios y de famas (Cronopios and Famas) (1962)
Todos los fuegos el fuego (All Fires the Fire) (1966)
Blow-up and Other Stories (1968); a compilation of stories from Bestiario, Final del juego and Las armas secretas, in an English-language translation.
Octaedro (1974)
Alguien que anda por ahí (1977)
Un tal Lucas (A Certain Lucas) (1979)
Queremos tanto a Glenda (We Love Glenda So Much) (1980)
Deshoras (Unreasonable Hours) (1982)

Poetry
Presencia (Presence) (1938)
Los reyes (The Kings) (1949)
Salvo el crepúsculo (Save Twilight) (1997; expanded edition, City Lights, 2016)

Other works
La vuelta al día en ochenta mundos (Around the Day in Eighty Worlds) (1967)
Último round (Last Round) (1969)
Prosa del Observatorio (From the Observatory) (1972)
Territorios (Territories) (1978)
La Puñalada/ El tango de la vuelta (Stab) (1979) (with Pat Andrea)
Los autonautas de la cosmopista (Autonauts of the Cosmoroute) (1983)
Nicaragua tan violentamente dulce (Nicaragua, So Violently Sweet) (1983)
Julio Cortazar: Al Termino del Polvo y el Sudor (Biblioteca de Marcha, Montevideo, 1987) – Essays by and about Julio Cortazar.
Diario de Andrés Fava (Diary of Andrés Fava) (1995), companion book to El examen.
Adiós Robinson (Goodbye, Robinson) (1995), radio text.
Imagen de John Keats (Image of John Keats) (1996)
Cartas (Letters) (Three volumes, 2000; expanded version in five volumes, 2012)
Papeles inesperados (Unexpected Papers) (2009)
Cartas a los Jonquières (Letters to the Jonquières) (2010)
Clases de literatura (Literature Class) (2013)

Graphic novel
Fantomas contra los vampiros multinacionales (Fantomas Versus the Multinational Vampires) (1975)

Recording from the Library of Congress 
 Julio Cortazar reading from his own work

Filmography
 La Cifra Impar, 1960. Feature film by Manuel Antín, based on "Letters from Mother".
 Circe, 1963. Feature film by Manuel Antín, based on "Circe". Script by Manuel Antin and Julio Cortázar.
 El Perseguidor, 1963. Feature film by Osias Wilenski, based on "El perseguidor".
 Intimidad de los Parques, 1965. Feature film by Manuel Antín.
 Blow Up, 1966. Feature film by Michelangelo Antonioni, based on "Las Babas del diablo".
 Cortázar, 1994. Documentary directed by Tristán Bauer.
 Cortázar, apuntes para un documental, documentary. Eduardo Montes-Bradley (Director), Soledad Liendo (Producer). Theatrical release 2002. DVD Release 2007.
 , 2005. Short movie based on Julio Cortázar's short story "Graffiti". Directed by Pako González.
 Graffiti, 2006. Short movie based on Julio Cortázar's short story "Graffiti". Directed by Vano Burduli 
 "Mentiras Piadosas" (released in English as Made Up Memories), 2009. Feature film by Diego Sabanés, based on the short-story "The Health of the Sick" and other short stories by Julio Cortázar.

See also
 État second
 Sophie Bohdan

References

Further reading

English 
 Julio Cortázar (Modern Critical Views). Bloom, Harold, 2005
 
 Julio Cortázar (Bloom's Major Short Story Writers). Bloom, Harold, 2004
 
 
 Questions of the Liminal in the Fiction of Julio Cortázar. Moran, Dominic, 2000
 Critical Essays on Julio Cortázar. Alazraki, Jaime, 1999
 
 
 The Politics of Style in the Fiction of Balzac, Beckett, and Cortázar. Axelrod, Mark, 1992
 Writing at Risk: Interviews in Paris With Uncommon Writers. Weiss, Jason, 1991

Spanish 
 Y el hombre dio su vuelta en ochenta mundos... (Homenaje a Julio Cortázar) (1914-2014), Luis Aguilar-Monsalve, (2015)
 Julio Cortázar. Una biografía revisada. Miguel Herráez, 2011
 Discurso del Oso. children's book illustrated by Emilio Urberuaga, Libros del Zorro Rojo, 2008

 Imagen de Julio Cortázar. Claudio Eduardo Martyniuk, 2004
 Julio Cortázar desde tres perspectivas. Luisa Valenzuela, 2002
 Otra flor amarilla: antología: homenaje a Julio Cortázar. Universidad de Guadalajara, 2002
 Julio Cortázar.  Cristina Peri Rossi, 2000
 Julio Cortázar.  Alberto Cousté, 2001
 Julio Cortázar. La biografía. Mario Goloboff, 1998
 La mirada recíproca: estudios sobre los últimos cuentos de Julio Cortázar. Peter Fröhlicher, 1995
 Hacia Cortázar: aproximaciones a su obra. Jaime Alazraki, 1994
 Julio Cortázar: mundos y modos. Saúl Yurkiévich, 1994
 Tiempo sagrado y tiempo profano en Borges y Cortázar. Zheyla Henriksen, 1992
 Cortázar: el romántico en su observatorio. Rosario Ferré, 1991
 Lo neofantástico en Julio Cortázar. Julia G Cruz, 1988
 Los Ochenta mundos de Cortázar: ensayos. Fernando Burgos, 1987
 En busca del unicornio: los cuentos de Julio Cortázar. Jaime Alazraki, 1983
 Teoría y práctica del cuento en los relatos de Cortázar. Carmen de Mora Valcárcel, 1982
 Julio Cortázar. Pedro Lastra, 1981
 Cortázar: metafísica y erotismo. Antonio Planells, 1979
 Es Julio Cortázar un surrealista?. Evelyn Picon Garfield, 1975
  Estudios sobre los cuentos de Julio Cortázar. David Lagmanovich, 1975
 Cortázar y Carpentier. Mercedes Rein, 1974
 Los mundos de Julio Cortázar. Malva E Filer, 1970

External links

 
 
 
 Julio Cortázar Collection (Finding Aid) – Princeton University Library Manuscripts Division
 Julio Cortázar Literary Manuscripts, 1943-1982 - Benson Latin American Collection
 Julio Cortázar: An Argentinean Master of Anti-novel and Experimental Literature
 Books and texts written by Julio Cortázar
 A translated excerpt from Prose from the Observatory
 Julio Cortázar interview 1979
 Julio Cortázar Artist bio and exhibitions on ArtDiscover 
 Julio Cortázar lee fragmentos de su obra (In Spanish)
 Julio Cortázar, his readers and Paris. Photo Essay 
 The Library of Julio Cortázar Virtual visit to his private library.(in English and Spanish)
 Julio Cortazar recorded at the Library of Congress for the Hispanic Division’s audio literary archive on November 20, 1975

 
1914 births
1984 deaths
20th-century Argentine male writers
20th-century Argentine novelists
20th-century atheists
20th-century essayists
20th-century French male writers
20th-century French non-fiction writers
20th-century French novelists
20th-century French photographers
20th-century memoirists
20th-century non-fiction writers
20th-century novelists
20th-century poets
20th-century short story writers
20th-century translators
Architectural photographers
Argentine atheists
Argentine comics artists
Argentine comics writers
Argentine emigrants to France
Argentine essayists
Argentine expatriates in France
Argentine male novelists
Argentine male poets
Argentine male short story writers
Argentine people of French descent
Argentine people of German descent
Argentine people of Spanish descent
Argentine photographers
Argentine speculative fiction writers
Argentine translators
Argentine travel writers
Argentine writers in French
Belgian emigrants to Argentina
Burials at Montparnasse Cemetery
Citizens of Argentina through descent
English–Spanish translators
French atheists
French autobiographers
French comics artists
French comics writers
French fantasy writers
French horror writers
French male essayists
French male non-fiction writers
French male novelists
French male poets
French male short story writers
French memoirists
French photographers
French–Spanish translators
French speculative fiction writers
French translators
French travel writers
Graphic novelists
Magic realism writers
Members of the Academy of Arts, Berlin
Naturalized citizens of France
Postmodern writers
Prix Médicis étranger winners
Surrealist writers
Translators of Edgar Allan Poe
University of Buenos Aires alumni
Weird fiction writers
Writers about activism and social change
Writers from Paris
Writers who illustrated their own writing